The Canadian Journal of Women and the Law is a biannual peer-reviewed academic journal publishing multi-disciplinary scholarship on the impact of law on women's social, economic, and legal status. Founded in 1985, the same year that the equality guarantee of the Canadian Charter of Rights and Freedoms came into force, it is currently published by the University of Toronto Press.

Abstracting and indexing
The journal is abstracted and indexed in:
 Academic Search Premier
 The Canadian Feminist Periodical Index (Print)
 Canadian Periodical Index
 Canadian Reference Centre
 Emerging Sources Citation Index (ESCI)
 Index to Canadian Legal Periodical Literature 
 Index to Legal Periodicals
 International Bibliography of the Social Sciences (IBSS)
 Legal Collection
 Microsoft Academic Search
 Project MUSE
 Scopus
 Studies on Women Abstracts
 Studies on Women and Gender Abstracts
 Ulrich's Periodicals Directory

References

External links

University of Toronto Press academic journals
Biannual journals
Publications established in 1985
English-language journals
1985 establishments in Canada